Mountain Hardwear is a subsidiary of Columbia Sportswear based in Richmond, California that manufactures and distributes apparel, accessories and equipment primarily for the high performance needs of mountaineering enthusiasts and outdoor athletes, as well as for consumers who are inspired by the outdoor lifestyle.

History
Mountain Hardwear was founded in 1993 in Richmond, California by a small group of former employees of Sierra Designs.  Soon after, Mountain Hardwear's first sponsored athlete, Ed Viesturs, the first American to climb all fourteen 8,000 meter peaks (8000ers), helped develop several of the company's products.  Today, Mountain Hardwear continues to associate with elite Alpine athletes.

Columbia Sportswear acquired Mountain Hardwear in 2003. The company is headquartered in Richmond, California. Mountain Hardwear opened its first retail location in Portland, Oregon in April 2008. A Seattle, Washington retail store opened on December 5, 2008. The company has over 90 people in their California office, and more than 35 sales reps and associates in the United States and other countries.

Sponsored athletes
Mountain Hardwear sponsors a number of athletes. Most are alpinists, climbers, or skiers. Sponsored athletes include:

Vivian Bruchez, Tim Emmet, Cheyne Lempe, Mike Libecki, Garrett Madison, Angela Payne, Ethan Pringle, Freddie Wilkinson.

Timeline
1993 Mountain Hardwear founded
1995 First window use in tent flies
1996 Pioneered Windstopper Fleece
1997 Storm Light (later named Conduit) waterproof/breathable membrane introduced
1999 Welded technology first used in apparel
1999 Conical Waists (patent) on pants and rotated seams on shirts for backpacking
1999 Babu Chiri Sherpa is the first person to overnight night on Everest summit in MHW tent
2000 Pioneered Gore-Tex XCR
2001 Partnered with Gore to develop Windstopper next-to-skin garment fabric
2002 Launch WindStopper softshell
2003 First waterproof sleeping bags
2006 Exodus Backpack System
2008 Introduced 25D Hollow-core tent flysheets
2009 Pioneered OutDry 3D lamination technology for gloves
2011 Pioneered DryQ waterproof/breathable fabrics
2011 Introduced ultra-light ripstop fabric - Ghost Whisperer - in anorak and down insulated jacket

References

External links
 Official Website
 Official Blog

1993 establishments in California
American companies established in 1993
Camping equipment manufacturers
Companies based in Richmond, California
Climbing and mountaineering equipment companies
Outdoor clothing brands
Sportswear brands